The women's K-1 500 metres event was an individual kayaking event conducted as part of the Canoeing at the 1992 Summer Olympics program.

Medalists

Results

Heats
16 competitors entered in three heats. The heats served as placement rounds for the semifinals.

Semifinals
Two semifinals were held. The top four finishers in each semifinal and the fastest fifth-place finisher advanced to the final.

Final
The final was held on August 7.

References
1992 Summer Olympics official report Volume 5. p. 146. 
Sports-reference.com 1992 women's K-1 500 m results.
Wallechinsky, David and Jaime Loucky (2008). "Canoeing: Women's Kayak Singles 500 Meters". In The Complete Book of the Olympics: 2008 Edition. London: Aurum Press Limited. p. 492.

Women's K-1 500
Olympic
Women's events at the 1992 Summer Olympics